The Four Seasons Hotel San Francisco & Residences is a  mixed-use development at 757 Market Street in San Francisco, California, near the Moscone Center. Completed in January 2001, the tower was the first skyscraper of the 21st century to be completed in the city.

Specifications
The five-star hotel has been operated by Four Seasons Hotels and Resorts since 2001, hosts 277 guest rooms and retail stores, and houses 142 luxury condominiums on the upper floors. The Four Seasons Hotel's restaurant is decorated with artwork and the hotel also operates a 10,000 sq.ft. fitness center.

Non-linear viscous dampers located at the top of the hotel tower help dampen some of the wind sway due to powerful winds off the Pacific Ocean.

As of 2019, it was the only Four Seasons location in San Francisco, but planned to be joined by two others in 2020, one located a block away at 706 Mission Street and the other occupying the former Loews Regency San Francisco in the Financial District.

Notable residents
As of 2013, then-CEO of Yahoo Marissa Mayer was living in the 38th-floor penthouse suite at the Four Seasons Hotel with her husband and growing family of three children, as well as live-in domestic help.

See also

InterContinental Hotel San Francisco
St. Regis Museum Tower
W Hotel San Francisco

References

External links
 Four Seasons Hotel San Francisco official website
 Four Seasons Residences San Francisco official website

Residential skyscrapers in San Francisco
Skyscraper hotels in San Francisco
Financial District, San Francisco
San Francisco
Market Street (San Francisco)
Residential buildings completed in 2001
Residential condominiums in San Francisco
Hotels established in 2001
2001 establishments in California